Francisco Pinto da Cunha Leal (22 August 1888 – 26 April 1970) was a Portuguese politician during the period of the Portuguese First Republic. He served as 84th Prime Minister of Portugal between 1921 and 1922.

References

1888 births
1970 deaths
People from Penamacor
Nationalist Republican Party (Portugal) politicians
Prime Ministers of Portugal
Finance ministers of Portugal